Hisri is a village in the Kisko CD block in the Lohardaga Sadar subdivision of the Lohardaga district in the Indian state of Jharkhand.

Geography

Location                                
Hisri is located at

Area overview 
The map alongside shows an undulating plateau area with the hilly tract in the west and north-west. Three Bauxite mining centres are marked. It is an overwhelmingly rural district with 87.6% of the population living in the rural areas.

Note: The map alongside presents some of the notable locations in the district. All places marked in the map are linked in the larger full screen map.

Demographics 
According to the 2011 Census of India, Hisri had a total population of 3,914, of which 1,962 (50%) were males and 1,952 (50%) were females. Population in the age range 0–6 years was 680. The total number of literate persons in Hisri was 2,008 (62.09% of the population over 6 years).

(*For language details see Kisko block#Language and religion)

Bauxite mines 
Lohardaga district has large reserves of world class bauxite across Pakhar, Hisari, Rudhali Pat, Khamar Pat and the mining area also extends to neighbouring districts.

Hindalco is developing a new Bauxte mining project at Hisri.

References 

Villages in Lohardaga district
Mining communities in Jharkhand